Yurla may refer to:
Yurla (dish), a Tibetan wheat pastry dish
Yurla (rural locality), a rural locality (a selo) in Yurlinsky District of Perm Krai, Russia